The King Sisters were an American big band-era vocal group consisting of six sisters: Alyce, Donna, Luise, Marilyn, Maxine, and Yvonne King.

History
Born and raised in Pleasant Grove, Utah, the King sisters were part of the Driggs family of entertainers. They were members of the Church of Jesus Christ of Latter-day Saints. Their father was William King Driggs.

Their first professional job was with a Salt Lake City radio station, from which they graduated to a station in Oakland, California. In the early 1930s sisters Luise, Maxine, and Alyce formed a vocal trio along the lines of their idols, the Boswell Sisters, and traveled to San Francisco to audition for radio station KGO (to replace the Boswell Sisters themselves, who were leaving the station). After this, Maxine retired to home life in Oakland and sisters Donna and Yvonne were added to the roster.

In 1935, the King Sisters accepted a job with bandleader Horace Heidt. Gradually, relations between the King Sisters and Heidt deteriorated to the point where they left the band.  In the following years, they separately and together sang with the bands of Artie Shaw's Old Gold program and Charlie Barnet and Al Pearce series. They turned down a request to be the vocal group for the Glenn Miller Orchestra. They recorded for Bluebird Records, a sub-label of RCA Victor and the same label as Miller, and also had their first hit with a vocal version of Miller's hit, "In the Mood".

In 1937, Luise married guitarist Alvino Rey. At the peak of the sisters' success, they appeared in a number of 1940s Hollywood films. During World War II, they appeared regularly on Kay Kyser's radio series. In late 1953, Alyce, Marilyn, and Yvonne joined Gene Autry's Melody Ranch on CBS Radio as the Gene Autry Blue Jeans, replacing the Pinafores (Eunice, Beulah, and Ione Kettle), and continued there along with Alvino Rey until the program's end in early May 1956. 

In 1965, the King Sisters began hosting their own ABC TV series, The King Family Show, which featured family members including Alyce's husband, actor Robert Clarke, and her sons, Ric and Lex de Azevedo, and Cam Clarke, as well as other talent. The show ran from 1965 to 1966, with a 1969 revival.

A second generation of the King Family, the Four King Cousins, continues to carry on the musical tradition. More prominently, Luise's grandsons Win and William Butler are also musicians as part of the rock band Arcade Fire.

Deaths
Alyce King Clarke died on August 23, 1996, from respiratory problems, aged 81. Luise King Rey died on August 4, 1997, aged 83, from cancer, in the year of her 60th wedding anniversary to Alvino Rey. Donna King Conkling died on June 16, 2007, aged 88, in Plano, Texas. Maxine King Thomas died on May 13, 2009, aged 97 in Corona, California. Yvonne "Vonnie" King Burch died on December 13, 2009, aged 89, after suffering a fall at her home in Santa Barbara, California. Marilyn King died on August 7, 2013, aged 82, from cancer, also in California; she was the last surviving sister.

Hit singles

References

External links

The King Sisters fan page, started in 2001

Bluebird Records artists
Capitol Records artists
Family musical groups
King family (show business)
Latter Day Saints from Utah
Musical groups established in 1935
Musical groups from Utah
People from Pleasant Grove, Utah
RCA Victor artists
Sibling musical groups
Swing music
Vocal quartets
Vocal trios
Warner Records artists